Mrinal Chatterjee  (born 10 February 1961)
is a media educator, author and trainer from Odisha, India and works as a professor and center head in the Indian Institute of Mass Communication, Dhenkanal.  He is the author of the book History of Journalism in Odisha, which is the first major publication on the history of journalism in Odisha. The book explains the state of journalism in Odisha from its beginning in the mid 19th century till mid-2013.

Prof. Chatterjee has also made immense contribution to the field of fiction writing with more than 10 novels publications, 7 short story collections and a series of columns in Odia dailies. He has published five books on journalism and mass communication in Odia. His recent book  'Glossary of Terms for Media Persons' helps students, media professionals, research scholars and all those people who want to have a tap on the words used in day-to-day affairs of journalism.

His Odia fiction Jagate Thiba Jate Dina published in 2010 has gained immense popularity among the readers in Odisha. The book is a collection of his columns published in the weekly Samaja Saptahiki. His novel Kandhei released on 15 December 2013, has also got positive reviews as the book not only breaks many myths about cats but also make the readers see the world through the eyes of a cat.

His latest novel Eka Sundar Chandini Ratire has been published by Shraddha Publication, Baleswar in March 2016. It is Dr Chatterjee's seven short story collection.  His sixth short story collection Yamraj Chutire (Yamraj on Leave) has been released on December 12, 2015 at Rajdhani Book Fair. It is published by Bhubaneswar-based Timepass Prakashan.  Assamese version of his popular Odia novel Yamraj Number 5003 has been released on February 22, 2016. The book is published by Bina Prakasani, Guwahati.

Career
He started his career as a lecturer in English in 1983, joined Sambad, an Odia daily in 1984 as sub-editor and became Edition-in-Charge of Sambad's North Odisha edition in December 1996. As a Journalist, Chatterjee has written extensively on Environment. He has been awarded the prestigious K.K. Birla Foundation Fellowship(1996) and Journalist Fellowship by Centre for Science and Environment(1991 and 1992).

He joined Indian Institute of Mass Communication (IIMC), Dhenkanl as Associate Professor in February 1999. He became Professor and head of the Eastern India campus of IIMC located in Dhenkanal, Odisha in June 2008.

He has also extensively worked in radio and television. He worked in AIR and Doordarshan in several capacities- as Announcer and Newsreader for over 7 years, besides doing various programs. He has written the story and screenplay of many successful tele-serials and anchored many radio and television programs.

Academic qualifications
 DLit, Berhampur University, Odish, 2022
 PhD (Journalism and Mass Communication), Berhampur University, 2007
 M.M.C.(Masters in Mass Communication) Guru Jambheswar University, 2002.
 M.A. (Public Administration), Utkal University, 1993
 M.A. (English), Utkal University, 1982
 LL.B. Utkal University, 1983
 H.S.C., BOSE, Odisha, 1976
 Certificate Course in Human Rights, IGNOU, 2007
 Certificate Course in German, Utkal University, 199

Teaching experience
 Professor (Communication), Regional Director, Indian Institute of Mass Communication (IIMC), Dhenkanal, Odisha since June 2008
 Associate Professor, (Communication Theory and Research), Indian Institute of Mass Communication (IIMC), Dhenkanal, Odisha since February 1999.

Papers published
 Sustainable Human Development and Role of Media, Role of Media in Development and Governance: A compilation of Articles, Centre for Media Research and Development Studies, Kolkata, 2008
 Sensitize Grassroot-level Journalists to reach Rural communities, Indian Media Studies Journal,	Volume 1, Number 1, July–December 2006

Publications
Non-Fiction:
Gana Madhyam O Sambadikata (Mass Media and Journalism), Sephali Communications, Balasore 1998. A collection of essays in Odia on Mass Media.
Pariibesh O Jana Sachetanata (Environment and Peoples' awareness), Pine Books, Cuttack, 1997. A research based book on peoples' awareness pertaining to environment in Odia.
Sabda, Chhabi, Akhara (Sound, Picture & Script), Sephali Communications, Bhubaneswar, 2002. A collection of essays in Odia in Mass Media.
Glossary of Terms for Media Persons, Sephali Communications, Dhenkanal, 2015
Odishare Sambadikatara Itihas, Sephali Communications, Dhenkanal, 2015
 History of Journalism in Odisha, Sephali Communications, Dhenkanal, 2015

Fiction :
Nian (The Fire), Pine Books, Cuttack 1997. A docu-fiction on Baripada Fire Tragedy.
 Bharatpur ra Bagha, (The Tiger of Bharatpur), Pine Books, Cuttack. 1995. Novel. A social satire.
Secretariat re Bagha (The Tiger in the Secretariat), Sephali Communications, Baripada. 1995. Novel. A political satire.
Orissa O Ananya Galpa ( Orissa and other stories), Friends Publishers, Cuttack. 1991. Anthology of short stories.
Brutta O Ananya Galpa  ( The Circle and other stories), Granthamandira, Cuttack, 2000. Anthology of short stories.
Shakti (The Power), Sephali Communications, Dhenkanal, 2000. A Novel.
Rangadhanga,  Prangyaloka, Puri, 2002
Bhala achha Nabaghana?(Are you well Nabaghana?) Sephali Communications, Dhenkanal, 2003.
Nabaghana Bhala Achhi (Nabaghana is well), Sephali Communications, Dhenkanal,  2005.
Bidhumukhi, Sephali Communications, Dhenkanal, 2005.
Sani Mandira Samnare Saat Bhikari (Seven Beggars in front of Sani Temple), Kadambini Media, Bhubaneswar, 2008. Novel.
Yamraj Chutire, Timepass Prakashan, Bhubaneswar, 2015 
Eka Sundar Chandini Ratire, Shraddha Publication, Baleswar, 2016 
Yamraj Number 5003 (Assamese), Bina Prakasani, Guwahati, 2016

Translation :
Saranagata. Original Bengali novel by Samaresh Mazumdar. Kahani, Cuttack. 1995.
Ekti Meye Lata. Original Bengali Children's Fiction. National Book Trust. 1997.
Nagaraja ra Duniya (The World of Nagaraj). Original English novel by R.K. Narayana. Pine Books, Cuttack. 1998
Samakaleen Gujarati Kahania (Contemporary Gujarati Stories). Original stories by contemporary Gujarati short story writers. National Book Trust, New Delh# 2005.
Amara gachapatra Dehrare ebebi Baduchi (Our trees still grow in Dehra). Original English stories by Ruskin Bond. Sahitya Akademi, Kolkata. 2005.	
Mahasweta Devinka Srestha Galpa (Best stories of Mahasweta Devi). Original Bengali short stories by Mahasweta Dev# National Book Trust, New Delh# 2006.

Radio Plays and Serials:
Yamaraj Chhutire ( Lord of Death on leave), Radio play. AIR, Cuttack. First broadcast- 2008
Ghataka (The Executioner), Radio play. AIR, Cuttack. First broadcast- 1992
Rabibara re Dine (On one Sunday) Radio play. AIR, Cuttack. First broadcast- 1992
Nabaghanara Sansara (The family of Nabaghana) Radio serial. AIR, Jeypore. Six Episodes. First broadcast- 2001
Kemiti Chalichi (How are things going), 13- episode Radio serial, AIR, Cuttack. First broadcast- 2004
E Duniya kala kimiya (The world mesmerised me), 13- episode Radio serial, AIR, Cuttack.	First broadcast – August 2006

Tele Serials:
Made in Odisha, E-TV Odia, Fifty plus Episodes. First telecast- 2002.
Kahile kahiba kahuchi, E-TV, Odia. Fifty plus episodes. First telecast- 2004

Awards
Sahakar Galpa Samman, January 2008
Felicited by ‘Dr. Radhanath Rath Sambad Sahitya Award by Utkal Sahitya Samaj, Cuttack. July 2007
Best Rural Journalist Award by Janavani, Bhubaneswar. February 2007
Mayurbhanj Samman, Baripada. December 2006
Odisha Living Legend Award by Odisha Diary,2013

References

External links
 https://web.archive.org/web/20110725184106/http://cmsvatavaran.org/cmsvata/cvdt.aspx?cvno=5
 http://orissamatters.com/news/index.php/category/achievers-2/
 https://web.archive.org/web/20100921073941/http://www.iimc.gov.in/mrinal-chatterjee.html

1961 births
20th-century Indian journalists
Living people
Odia-language writers
Journalists from Odisha
Writers from West Bengal